Jaya Indravarman II or Prince Vak (1071–1113), was a king of Champa, ruling the kingdom for two periods, from 1080 to 1081, and from 1086 to until his death in 1113.

Young Prince Vak was enthroned in 1080 by his father Harivarman IV as a nine-year-old boy, "did not know how to govern the kingdom properly and did everything contrary to the rules of the government," was considered not eligible to rule. His uncle, Prince Pang, exercised power as the court regent, then crowned himself as king Paramabhodisattva of Champa in 1081. 

Five years later, Jaya Indravarman II launched a coup and dethroned his ruling uncle, then reestablished himself back to the crown. Indravarman II resumed the relationship with the Song dynasty. In 1103, a Vietnamese refugee who had fled to Champa, persuaded the king to set out and retake three northern provinces that were believed to have lost to Dai Viet during previous decades. His campaign was successful at first, but he was only able to hold them for several months before leaving these provinces back to the Dai Viet.

Indravarman II's reign continued peacefully until his death in 1113. During that time, he restored temples and infrastructures in My Son and initiated the elaboration of the Thap Mam Style. He was succeeded by one of his nephews, Harivarman V.

References

Bibliography
 
  

 

Kings of Champa
11th-century Vietnamese monarchs
12th-century Vietnamese monarchs
1071 births
1113 deaths